The Anmatyerre are an Aboriginal people of the Northern Territory of Australia

Anmatyerre (which may also be spelt Anmatjera, Anmatyerr, Anmatjirra, or Amatjere)  may also refer to:

Anmatjere, Northern Territory, a locality in Australia
Anmatyerre language, the language of the Anmatyerre 
Anmatjere Community, or Anmatyerre  Community, a former local government area in the Northern Territory of Australia